Harlech is a seaside resort and community in Gwynedd, north Wales and formerly in the historic county of Merionethshire. It lies on Tremadog Bay in the Snowdonia National Park. Before 1966, it belonged to the Meirionydd District of the 1974 County of Gwynedd. Its landmark Harlech Castle was begun in 1283 by Edward I of England, captured by Owain Glyndŵr, and in the 1480s, a stronghold of Henry Tudor. Once on a seaside cliff face, it is now half a mile (800 m) inland. New housing has appeared in the low town and in the high town around the shopping street, church and castle. The two are linked by a steep road called "Twtil". Of its 1,447 inhabitants, 51 per cent habitually speak Welsh. The built-up area with Llanfair had a population of 1,762 in the 2001 census, over half of whom lacked Welsh identity, and the electoral ward which includes Talsarnau 1,997 in the 2011 census. The estimate in 2019 was 1,881.

Etymology
The exact derivation of the name "Harlech" is unclear. Some, mostly older sources derive it from Arddlech, i. e.  (high) +  (rock), referring to the prominent crag on which the castle stands. Recent sources prefer a simpler derivation from the two Welsh words  (fair/fine) and llech (slate/rock).

As late as the 19th century some texts referred to "Harddlech" and "Harddlech Castle". This name appears in the mid-19th century translation of the Mabinogion: "And one afternoon he was at Harddlech in Ardudwy, at a court of his. And they were seated upon the rock of Harddlech overlooking the sea." Contemporary documents from the time of the Mabinogion do not mention Harlech, referring only to Llywelyn building his castle "at Ardudwy".

Governance
An electoral ward in the same name includes Talsarnau community. The ward population at the 2011 census was 1,997.

Transport
Harlech railway station is served by the Cambrian Coast Line. The town contains Ffordd Pen Llech, a street down the rock spur to the north of the castle. It is the steepest signed, public paved road in the United Kingdom and possibly the steepest in the world, but see the section below.

Educational facilities
Ysgol Ardudwy is the county secondary school for children aged 11–16. Ysgol Tanycastell is the town's primary school for children aged 3–11. The town was until 2017 the home of Wales's only long-term adult residential college, Coleg Harlech, also known as the "college of second chance". The premises remain in use as part of Adult Learning Wales – Addysg Oedolion Cymru.

Demographics
The 2011 census recorded 1,762 usual residents.  The village is fairly Anglicised, with 48% of residents having been born in Wales and 46.9% born in England. Correspondingly, only 42.6% reported having a Welsh national identity.

Recreation
Theatr Harlech (formerly Theatr Ardudwy) is located on the Coleg Harlech campus and stages a varied selection of plays, music and films throughout the year.

Other attractions in Harlech include its beach backed with sand dunes and the Royal Saint David's Golf Club, which hosted its fifth British Ladies Amateur in 2009. The Rhinogydd (or Rhinogs) range of mountains rises to the east.

In 2007, a Lockheed P-38 Lightning (a World War II-era fighter aircraft) was rediscovered on Harlech beach. It has been described as "one of the most important WWII finds in recent history". The International Group for Historic Aircraft Recovery (TIGHAR) expressed an interest in salvaging the wreck of the U.S. Army Air Forces plane, known as the Maid of Harlech. However, in August 2019, Cadw, the Welsh government's historic environment service, gave the remains scheduled status, making it the first legally designated military aircraft crash site in the UK to be protected for its historic and archaeological interest. The site is also controlled under the Protection of Military Remains Act 1986. The aircraft came down in September 1942 when it was on a gunnery practice mission. The pilot was Second Lt Robert F Elliott, 24, of Rich Square, North Carolina, who survived the crash, only to be reported missing in action a few months later.

Harlech has a Scout hut, which acts as a base for outdoor recreational activities.

In traditional and popular culture
A street in Harlech, Ffordd Pen Llech, was recognised in 2019 by the Guinness World Records as the steepest residential street in the world with a gradient of 1:2.67 (37.45%); however, Baldwin Street in Dunedin, New Zealand, was then recognised with a gradient of 1:2.86 (35%). The steepness was determined by measuring consistently on the lower side of the street – the left or right, whichever was lower. It was later decided that  measuring consistently in the middle of the street would be more accurate. This gave Baldwin Street a gradient of 34.8% and Ffordd Pen Llech one of 28.6%, so the title returned to Baldwin Street.
In the second branch of the Mabinogi ("Branwen, Daughter of Llŷr"), Harlech is the seat of Bendigeidfran, Branwen's brother and king of the Isle of the Mighty.
The song Men of Harlech is traditionally said to describe events during the seven-year siege of the castle in 1461–1468.
ITV Wales & West was formerly known as HTV/Harlech Television after its founder Lord Harlech.

Notable residents
In birth order:
Owain Glyndŵr (c. 1359 – c. 1415), Welsh Rebellion leader, was the last Welshman to claim the title Prince of Wales.
Ellis Wynne (1671 in Lasynys Fawr – 1734), Welsh-language author and clergyman
Alfred Perceval Graves (1846–1931), poet, bard and songwriter. He and a large family, including his son the poet Robert Graves, spent summers at Erinfa, a large house north-east of Harlech.
George Davison (1854–1930), photographer
Margaret More (1903–1966), composer, was born here.
Elinor Lyon (1921–2008), children's writer, retired here in 1975 with her schoolteacher husband.
David Gwilym Morris Roberts (1925–2020), civil engineer, was born here.
Mari Strachan (born 1945), novelist and librarian, attended secondary school here.
Philip Pullman (born 1946), children's novelist, attended secondary school here.

Gallery

See also
Morfa Harlech sand dunes
Harlech Castle
St David's Hotel
Lord Harlech
HTV – Harlech Television

References

External links

Harlech Tourism Association
geograph.co.uk – photos of Harlech and surrounding area

 
Towns in Gwynedd
Elinor Lyon
Aviation accidents and incidents locations in Wales